The 2018–19 Rutgers Scarlet Knights women's basketball team represents Rutgers University during the 2018–19 NCAA Division I women's basketball season. The Scarlet Knights, led by 24th year head coach C. Vivian Stringer, play their home games at the Louis Brown Athletic Center, better known as The RAC, as a member of the Big Ten Conference. They finished the season 22–10, 13–5 in Big Ten play to finish in third place. They advanced to the semifinals of the Big Ten women's tournament where they lost to Iowa. They received an at-large bid to the NCAA women's tournament in the 7th seed in the Albany Regional where they got upset by Buffalo in the first round.

Roster

Schedule

|-
!colspan=9 style=| Regular season

|-
!colspan=9 style=| Big Ten Women's Tournament

|-
!colspan=9 style=| NCAA Women's Tournament

Rankings

See also
 2018–19 Rutgers Scarlet Knights men's basketball team

References 

Rutgers Scarlet Knights women's basketball seasons
Rutgers
Rutgers
Rutgers
Rutgers